7I or 7-I can refer to:

IATA code for Insel Air
Seven & I Holdings Co., Japanese holding company for 7-Eleven
Minolta Dimage 7i, a digital bridge camera by Minolta

See also
I7 (disambiguation)